The Ellis W. Hawley Prize is an annual book award by the Organization of American Historians for the best historical study of the political economy, politics, or institutions of the United States, in its domestic or international affairs, from the American Civil War to the present. The prize honors Ellis W. Hawley, Emeritus Professor of History, University of Iowa, for his outstanding work in these subjects The Ellis W. Hawley Prize was first approved at the annual business meeting of the Organization of American Historians on April 1, 1995, and first awarded in 1997. The awarding committee is composed of three members appointed annually by the President of the Organization of American Historians. The winner receives five hundred dollars.

See also

 List of history awards

References

External links
 OAH Source

Economic history of the United States
American history awards
History books about the United States
History of the foreign relations of the United States
Political history of the United States